Florea is both a Romanian surname and a masculine Romanian given name. Notable people with the name include:

Surname:
Daniel Florea, Romanian footballer
Daniel Florea, Romanian politician
Daniel Constantin Florea, Romanian footballer
Dick Florea, American television personality
John Florea, American photographer
Laurenţiu Florea, Romanian footballer
Nikolay Florea (1912–1941), Ukrainian Soviet astronomer
Răzvan Florea, Romanian swimmer
Sandu Florea, Romanian and American comic book artist

Given name:
Florea Dumitrache (1948–2007), Romanian footballer
Florea Voinea (born 1941), Romanian footballer

Other uses
Florea (millipede), a genus of crested millipedes in the family Tynommatidae.

See also 

Florescu (surname)
Florești (disambiguation)
Apis florea, an Asian species of wild honeybees

Romanian masculine given names
Romanian-language surnames